Perfect Dark is a video game released for the Nintendo 64 in 2000.

Perfect Dark may also refer to:

 Perfect Dark (series), a video game franchise
 Perfect Dark (Game Boy Color video game), a video game released for the Game Boy Color in 2000
 Perfect Dark (2010 video game), a remaster of the Nintendo 64 game, released for the Xbox 360 in 2010
 Perfect Dark (upcoming video game), a video game currently in development by The Initiative and Crystal Dynamics
 Joanna Dark, a fictional character code-named "Perfect Dark"
 Perfect Dark (P2P), a peer-to-peer file sharing application